Until 1 January 2007 Helle municipality was a municipality (Danish, kommune) in Ribe County on the Jutland peninsula in southwest Denmark.  It covered an area of 281 km² and had a total population of 8,319 (2005).  Its last mayor was Gylling Haahr, a member of the Venstre (Liberal Party) political party. The main town and site of its municipal council was the town of Årre.

Helle municipality ceased to exist due to Kommunalreformen ("The Municipality Reform" of 2007).  It was merged with existing Blaabjerg, Blåvandshuk, Varde, and Ølgod municipalities to form a new Varde Municipality in Region of Southern Denmark.

External links
 Varde municipality's official website (Danish only)

References 
 Municipal statistics: NetBorger Kommunefakta, delivered from KMD aka Kommunedata (Municipal Data)
 Municipal mergers and neighbors: Eniro  new municipalities map

Former municipalities of Denmark